The Supertaça de Portugal Feminina is an annual Portuguese football match played since 2015 between the winners of the Portuguese league, Campeonato Nacional Feminino, and the holders of the Portuguese Cup, Taça de Portugal Feminina. If the champions also win the Cup (i.e. achieve the double, Portuguese: dobradinha), they play against the Cup runners-up.

The first edition of the Super cup, played in August 2015, saw Futebol Benfica beat Clube de Albergaria 4–0.

Editions

Note: teams in italics played the Super Cup as losing Cup finalists, since their opponents had won both the Championship and the Cup in the same year (that is, made the double).

Performance by club

See also

 List of association football competitions#Portugal

References

External links

3
Portugal
2015 establishments in Portugal